The Mausoleum of Néstor Kirchner is located at Río Gallegos, Santa Cruz, Argentina. It was built in 2011, one year after his death and state funeral. It houses the remains of Kirchner and his parents; Ana María Ostoic died in 2013. It was built by Lázaro Báez and it measures 13 meters long, 15 meters wide and 11 meters tall.

References

Bibliography
 

Néstor Kirchner
Mausoleums in Argentina
Tourist attractions in Santa Cruz Province, Argentina
Buildings and structures in Santa Cruz Province, Argentina
2011 establishments in Argentina